The Women Handball Liga Austria (WHA) is the name of the handball league of Austria.

Competition Format 

The season begins with a regular season between the twelve teams. The first two teams qualifies to the final.

Women Handball Liga Austria past champions

 1972 : Union Admira Landhaus
 1973 : Union Admira Landhaus (2)
 1974 : Union Admira Landhaus (3)
 1975 : Union Admira Landhaus (4)
 1976 : Union Admira Landhaus (5)
 1977 : Hypo NÖ
 1978 : Hypo NÖ (2)
 1979 : Hypo NÖ (3)
 1980 : Hypo NÖ (4)
 1981 : Hypo NÖ (5)
 1982 : Hypo NÖ (6)
 1983 : Hypo NÖ (7)
 1984 : Hypo NÖ (8)
 1985 : Hypo NÖ (9)
 1986 : Hypo NÖ (10)
 1987 : Hypo NÖ (11)
 1988 : Hypo NÖ (12)
 1989 : Hypo NÖ (13)
 1990 : Hypo NÖ (14)
 1991 : Hypo NÖ (15)
 1992 : Hypo NÖ (16)
 1993 : Hypo NÖ (17)
 1994 : Hypo NÖ (18)
 1995 : Hypo NÖ (19)
 1996 : Hypo NÖ (20)
 1997 : Hypo NÖ (21)
 1998 : Hypo NÖ (22)
 1999 : Hypo NÖ (23)
 2000 : Hypo NÖ (24)
 2001 : Hypo NÖ (25)
 2002 : Hypo NÖ (26)
 2003 : Hypo NÖ (27)
 2004 : Hypo NÖ (28)
 2005 : Hypo NÖ (29)
 2006 : Hypo NÖ (30)
 2007 : Hypo NÖ (31)
 2008 : Hypo NÖ (32)
 2009 : Hypo NÖ (33)
 2010 : Hypo NÖ (34)
 2011 : Hypo NÖ (35)
 2012 : Hypo NÖ (36)
 2013 : Hypo NÖ (37)
 2014 : Hypo NÖ (38)
 2015 : Hypo NÖ (39)
 2016 : Hypo NÖ (40)
 2017 : Hypo NÖ (41)
 2018 : Hypo NÖ (42)
 2019 : WAT Atzgersdorf
 2020 : not awarded
 2021 : Hypo NÖ (43)
 2022 : Hypo NÖ (44)

EHF coefficient ranking
For season 2017/2018, see footnote

12.  (15)  PGNiG Superliga (26.00)
13.  (16)  Süper Ligi (24.36)
14.  (9)  Women Handball Liga Austria (23.92)
15.  (13)  1. HRL (22.75)
16.  (14)  División de Honor (22.30)

External links
 Official website

References

Women Handball Liga Austria
Austria
Handball